Simona Viola (born 18 November 1971) is an Italian retired female long-distance runner and marathon runner, who competed at the 2003 World Championships in Athletics.

Achievements

References

External links
 

1971 births
Living people
Italian female middle-distance runners
Italian female long-distance runners
Italian female marathon runners
World Athletics Championships athletes for Italy
Italian masters athletes
20th-century Italian women
21st-century Italian women